This is an incomplete list of Statutory Instruments of the United Kingdom in 1964.

Prison Rules 1964 SI 1964/388
The Road Vehicles (Index Marks) Regulations 1964 SI 1964/404
Benefit Regulations 1964 SI 1964/504
Sheffield Water Order 1964 SI 1964/670
Offices, Shops and Railway Premises Act 1963 (Exemption No. 1) Order 1964 SI 1964/964
Washing Facilities Regulations 1964 SI 1964/965
Sanitary Conveniences Regulations 1964 SI 1964/966
Examination of Steam Boiler Reports (No 1) Order 1964 SI 1964/1070
Industrial Training (Construction Board) Order 1964 SI 1964/1079
Industrial Training (Engineering Board) Order 1964 SI 1964/1086
Artificial Insemination of Pigs (Scotland) Regulations 1964 SI 1964/1171
Artificial Insemination of Pigs (England and Wales) Regulations 1964 SI 1964/1172
Act of Adjournal (Rules for Legal Aid in Criminal Proceedings) 1964 SI 1964/1409
Act of Adjournal (Criminal Legal Aid Fees) 1964 SI 1964/1410
Legal Aid (Scotland) (Expenses of Successful Unassisted Parties) Regulations 1964 SI 1964/1513
Plant Varieties and Seeds (Northern Ireland) Order 1964 SI 1964/1574
Act of Sederunt (Legal Aid Rules) 1964 SI 1964/1622
Barnsley Corporation (Reduction of Compensation Water) Order 1964 SI 1964/1866
Diplomatic Privileges (Citizens of the United Kingdom and Colonies) Order 1964 SI 1964/2043
War Pensions (Mercantile Marine) Scheme 1964 SI 1964/2058

External links
Legislation.gov.uk delivered by the UK National Archive
UK SI's on legislation.gov.uk
UK Draft SI's on legislation.gov.uk

See also
List of Statutory Instruments of the United Kingdom

Lists of Statutory Instruments of the United Kingdom
Statutory Instruments